Zuma is the third studio album by American country music group Southern Pacific. It was released in 1988 via Warner Bros. Records. The album inlucdes the singles "Midnight Highway", "New Shade of Blue", and "Honey I Dare You" and "All Is Lost".

Track listing

Chart performance

References

1988 albums
Southern Pacific (band) albums
Albums produced by Jim Ed Norman
Warner Records albums